Ostallgäu is an electoral constituency (German: Wahlkreis) represented in the Bundestag. It elects one member via first-past-the-post voting. Under the current constituency numbering system, it is designated as constituency 257. It is located in southwestern Bavaria, comprising the cities of Kaufbeuren and Memmingen, the Ostallgäu district, and most of the Unterallgäu district.
Ostallgäu was created for the inaugural 1949 federal election. Since 2009, it has been represented by Stephan Stracke of the Christian Social Union (CSU).

Geography
Ostallgäu is located in southwestern Bavaria. As of the 2021 federal election, it comprises the independent cities of Kaufbeuren and Memmingen, the Ostallgäu district, and the entirety of the Unterallgäu district excluding the Verwaltungsgemeinschaften of Babenhausen, Boos, Erkheim, and Pfaffenhausen.

History
Ostallgäu was created in 1949, then known as Kaufbeuren. It acquired its current name in the 1976 election. In the 1949 election, it was Bavaria constituency 45 in the numbering system. In the 1953 through 1961 elections, it was number 240. In the 1965 through 1972 elections, it was number 242. In the 1976 through 1998 elections, it was number 243. In the 2002 and 2005 elections, it was number 258. Since the 2009 election, it has been number 257.

Originally, the constituency comprised the independent city of Kaufbeuren and the districts of Landkreis Kaufbeuren, Füssen, Marktoberdorf, and Schwabmünchen. In the 1965 through 1972 elections, it comprised the independent cities of Kaufbeuren and Memmingen and the districts of Landkreis Kaufbeuren, Landkreis Memmingen, Mindelheim, and Marktoberdorf. In the 1976 through 1990 elections, it comprised the cities of Kaufbeuren and Memmingen and the districts of Ostallgäu and Unterallgäu. It acquired its current borders in the 1994 election.

Members
Like most constituencies in rural Bavaria, it is an CSU safe seat, the party holding the seat continuously since its creation. It was first represented by Josef Spies from 1949 to 1965, followed by Hans August Lücker from 1965 to 1980. Kurt Rossmanith was representative from 1980 to 2009, a total of eight consecutive terms. Stephan Stracke was elected in 2009, and re-elected in 2013, 2017, and 2021.

Election results

2021 election

2017 election

2013 election

2009 election

References

Federal electoral districts in Bavaria
1949 establishments in West Germany
Constituencies established in 1949
Kaufbeuren
Memmingen
Ostallgäu
Unterallgäu